Rafaela is a city in the province of Santa Fe, Argentina, about 96 km from the provincial capital. It is the head town of the Castellanos Department.

The city was established in 1881 by Guillermo Lehmann, and officially became a city in 1913. The city has grown 22.2% between 1991 and 2001, and 18.6% in the last census period (2001-2011) according to the official data of the Population Census (INDEC). The city is almost the exact antipode of Wuhu in China.

The city hosts Rafaela Aerodrome airport and the Autódromo Ciudad de Rafaela race track.

Zoning of the city
The design of most of the urban area of the city has a shape of a checkerboard with the main plaza (Plaza 25 de mayo) in the middle of the city and four main boulevards coming from there. The street grid of the city is composed by square blocks in most part of the neighborhoods, mainly in the historical and older part of the city. 

  
The city has 37 neighborhoods and the downtown area (called Microcentro in Spanish) as the map of the city shows.

Role of citizen participation in planning 

In 2008 the municipality of Rafaela created the Department of Administration and Participation (Secretaria de Gestión y Participación, SGP) and after that the government started implementing a process of Participatory budgeting, based on the successful case of Porto Alegre. The main goal of this process is to consolidate and strengthen the importance of citizen participation in the public agenda.  
The government of the city has implemented the method for three consecutive years. The first one in 2009 was completed; the one for 2010 is now in the stage of implementing the public works that resulted from the participation process; and the third project is in process (SGP, Municipalidad de Rafaela, 2011).

Climate

Notable people
Hermes Binner, twice mayor of Rosario and former governor of Santa Fe province.
Javier Frana, professional tennis player
Ricardo Lorenzetti, president elect of the Argentine Supreme Court of Justice
Sebastián Porto, former professional motorcycle racer
María Emilia Salerni, professional tennis player
Martín Basso, professional TC racer
Lucas Aveldaño, professional soccer player
Silvia Bertolaccini, former LPGA professional golf player and current ESPN announcer for Latin America
Denis Stracqualursi, professional soccer player currently at Everton F.C.
Grillo Demo, contemporary artist
Axel Werner, professional footballer who plays for Spanish club Málaga CF on loan from Atlético Madrid as a goalkeeper.

Twin towns – sister cities

Rafaela is twinned with:
 Fossano, Italy
 Sigmaringendorf, Germany

References

External links

Rafaela.com
City Portal
Asociación Médica del Departamento Castellanos

Urban planning in Argentina
Populated places in Santa Fe Province
Populated places established in 1881
Cities in Argentina
1881 establishments in Argentina
Argentina
Santa Fe Province